The Talented Touch is an album by American jazz pianist Hank Jones recorded in 1958 for the Capitol label.

Reception

Allmusic awarded the album 3½ stars stating "The tracks are rather brief, running less than three and a half minutes each, though musicians the caliber of these four gentleman can say a lot more musically in that time frame than most can during a ten-minute performance. Although this album isn't one of Hank Jones' most essential dates as a leader, it is worth purchasing if it can be found". In JazzTimes, Thomas Conrad wrote "The down-the-middle renditions and charming tags and gentle, tinkling flourishes could have been provided by an artist less accomplished than Hank Jones-although not with his polished elegance. If caution renders this session less than indispensable, it is hard to imagine a nicer, more reassuring piano album to come home to after a difficult day at the office".

Track listing
 "If I Love Again" (Jack Murray, Ben Oakland) - 1:58
 "My One and Only Love" (Guy Wood, Robert Mellin) - 2:35
 "Don't Ever Leave Me" (Jerome Kern, Oscar Hammerstein II) - 2:38
 "It's Easy to Remember" (Richard Rodgers, Lorenz Hart) - 2:45
 "You Are My Love" (Stanley Bass) - 3:00
 "Blue Lights" (Gigi Gryce) - 2:58
 "The Blue Room" (Richard Rodgers, Lorenz Hart) - 2:43
 "A Sunday Kind of Love" (Barbara Belle, Anita Leonard, Louis Prima, Stan Rhodes) - 2:44
 "Star Eyes" (Gene de Paul, Don Raye) - 2:49
 "Let Me Know" (Hank Jones) - 2:30
 "Try a Little Tenderness" (Jimmy Campbell, Reg Connelly, Harry M. Woods) - 3:33
 "Easy to Love" (Cole Porter) - 3:21

Personnel 
Hank Jones - piano
Barry Galbraith - guitar 
Milt Hinton - bass
Osie Johnson - drums

References 

1958 albums
Hank Jones albums
Capitol Records albums